The Chrysler Pacifica is a minivan produced by the Chrysler division of Stellantis. It is unrelated to the discontinued crossover and concept vehicles by the same name and replaced the Chrysler Town & Country for the 2017 model year. It is positioned as the higher-end Chrysler minivan, above the Dodge Grand Caravan until 2020 and above the Chrysler Voyager (rebadged as the Chrysler Grand Caravan in Canada) since 2020.

The minivan is produced with two powertrains, a 3.6 L gasoline-powered engine and a plug-in hybrid. The gasoline-only version of the Pacifica minivan went on sale in mid-2016, while the plug-in hybrid version became available in early 2017.

History

Development
In June 2013, it was reported that Chrysler was preparing to produce a new generation of its Town & Country minivan at the Windsor Assembly Plant, with production set to begin in 2015 and a release for the 2017 model year. An industry analyst reported that the new version would possibly be a crossover utility vehicle in the vein of the Pacifica.

In 2015, FCA CEO Sergio Marchionne announced that it would invest $2 billion in developing a new minivan, and overhauling the Windsor Assembly Plant to facilitate its production. A company issued plan of future vehicles revealed that a new Town & Country would begin production in February 2016 for the 2017 model year, and that the final-generation Dodge Grand Caravan would be maintained in parallel with the new Town & Country as a lower-cost option during the 2017 model year, after which it will be discontinued. Marchionne has been against "duplicate[d] investments" in product development—a strategy reflected by his reduction of badge-engineering between FCA US's domestic marques. 

On November 3, 2015, FCA filed to have its trademark registration on the Pacifica brand renewed; FCA's Head of Passenger Car Brands Timothy Kuniskis denied that this was related to any new products, and that it was standard industry practice to continue renewing its trademarks because "you don't want to lose names. Establishing new names is expensive."

Model years
Chrysler debuted the new vehicle on January 11, 2016, at the 2016 North American International Auto Show. Rather than being named the Town & Country, the new vehicle was branded as the Pacifica. The decision to drop the Town & Country brand was made primarily to distinguish the new vehicle from previous iterations; Director of Chrysler brand product marketing Bruce Velisek explained that the Pacifica was meant to "change the entire paradigm of what people know about minivans in the segment". Among its differences from the previous Town & Country is a new platform, and a design carrying a sportier appearance inspired by crossovers—a market segment that had cannibalized minivan sales—in an effort to disassociate the vehicle from other minivans with a boxier build. Chrysler also changed the minivan's sliding doors: they will be aluminum and hands-free, opening automatically when the fob holder waves under them.

This was  less than the starting price of the 2016 Town & Country.

Plug-in hybrid
The production of a plug-in hybrid version was the first of its class in the United States, and according to chief engineer Kevin Mets, meant to create an electric vehicle that could feasibly be a family's "primary vehicle". The Pacifica Hybrid has a 16 kWh battery pack qualifying it in the US for the full  federal tax credit and also to other incentives at the state and local level. In June 2017, Chrysler recalled 1,600 Pacificas to fix the electronics.

Autonomous version

On November 7, 2017, Waymo announced that it had begun testing driverless cars without a safety driver at the driver position using the Pacifica plug-in.

AWD version
The AWD option was made available in June 2020 for 2020 Touring-L models equipped with the AWD Launch Edition package. The Pacifica is currently the only minivan in the North American market to feature a traditional AWD system as the fourth-generation Toyota Sienna has switched to the E-four system with the rear wheels driven electrically.

Chrysler Voyager 

Starting with the 2020 model year, the low-end "L" and "LX" models have been separated from the Pacifica nameplate and are now sold under the Voyager nameplate in the United States. This marked the return of the Voyager nameplate to the Chrysler model lineup, in which it was last used in 2016, and the North American market, in which it was last used in 2003 in the U.S. and 2007 in Mexico. In addition to the L and LX trim levels, an "LXi" model is available to fleet customers.

In the 2021 model year, Canadian sales of the model started under the Chrysler Grand Caravan nameplate with trim level designations carried over from the outgoing Dodge Grand Caravan (as opposed to the former base Pacifica) and no equivalent to the LXi model. This marked the return of the "Chrysler Grand Caravan" nameplate which was last used in 2007, primarily in South American markets.

The Voyager was restricted in the United States to fleet buyers for the 2022 model year. It continues the pre-facelift design and includes a long list of features and equipment with only two options: (1) the "SafetyTec Group" (Advanced Brake Assist, Pedestrian Emergency Braking, Full-Speed Forward Collision Warning Plus, Uconnect 5 NAV with 10.1-inch Display, ParkSense Rear Park Assist System with Stop, and Blind Spot Monitoring with Rear Cross-Path Detection System) and (2) the "Fleet Security Group" (Two additional key fobs and SiriusXM Guardian trial).

2021 facelift 
A restyled 2021 Chrysler Pacifica was introduced at the 2020 Chicago Auto Show in Chicago, Illinois. The 2021 model year Pacifica featured new exterior styling and is now available with all-wheel-drive (AWD) for gasoline-powered models. The Pacifica Hybrid versions use front-wheel-drive. 

Unlike previous AWD Chrysler minivans, the AWD Pacifica retains the Stow 'n' Go seating. It is the first Fiat Chrysler Automobiles vehicle to feature the new Android-based Uconnect 5 infotainment system with a standard 10.1-inch high-resolution touchscreen display and wireless Apple CarPlay and Android Auto smartphone integration, as well as Amazon Alexa capabilities, as well as SiriusXM Satellite Radio and high-speed data connectivity. USB-C high-speed data and charging ports are standard equipment, and TomTom-based GPS navigation are optional. The "FamCam" rear camera system can display an image of rear passengers in place of a conversation mirror.

A new Pinnacle trim level adds "Pinnacle" badging on the front doors, unique leather seat trim, quilted leather pillows for the second-row seats, and unique exterior styling cues.

Production 

Production of the vehicle uses an all-new platform at the Windsor Plant in Windsor, Ontario, Canada.

Powertrains 
The Pacifica uses a new revision of the 3.6 L Pentastar V6 engine, and is produced with two powertrains: gasoline-only and plug-in hybrid, the latter marketed as Pacifica Hybrid. 

The plug-in hybrid version uses a 16-kWh lithium-ion battery, located under the floor under the second row of seats (the hybrid is not available with all-wheel drive, eight-passenger seating, Stow'n'Go seating or vacuum), with an all-electric range of  before switching back to using the gasoline engine. The battery can be fully recharged in two hours using a 240-volt plug-in system. 

The gasoline-only version of the Pacifica minivan went on sale in mid-2016; the plug-in hybrid version, in 2017. Chrysler expected the plug-in hybrid model to achieve a fuel economy of at least 80 miles per gallon equivalent, and on December 1, 2016, the EPA announced the minivan achieved 84 MPGe.

Fuel economy 
The Pacifica Hybrid operating in hybrid mode has the highest fuel economy of any minivan available in the American market . The following table presents the U.S. EPA fuel economy ratings for all powertrain variants of the Chrysler Pacifica.

Safety

NHTSA

IIHS

2017
The 2017 Pacifica was tested by the Insurance Institute for Highway Safety (IIHS), and its top trim received a Top Safety Pick+ award:

* rating applies to models built after August 2016

2022
The 2022 Pacifica was tested by the Insurance Institute for Highway Safety (IIHS), and it received a Top Safety Pick+ award:

Awards
As of December 2020, the Pacifica has earned 140 honors and industry accolades. Among them:
 "Best Minivan of 2016" by Cars.com 
 2017 "Best New Large Utility Vehicle" by the Automobile Journalists Association of Canada (AJAC) 
 "2017 North American Utility of the Year" by a panel of automotive experts 
 2017 Family Vehicle of the Year by the Midwest Automotive Media Association 
 "2017 Drivers’ Choice Award for Best Minivan" from MotorWeek 
 "2017 Crossover-SUV of the Year" by the Rocky Mountain Automotive Press 
 "Top Minivan of 2017" by New York Daily News Autos Team 
 Best Minivan by Popular Mechanics as part of its 2017 Automotive Excellence Awards 
 2020 Pacifica Hybrid: Top Consumer Rated Van/Minivans of 2020 by Kelly Blue Book 
 2020 Best Family Car by Parents magazine as the "Best Eco Pick" 
2021 Consumer Guide Best Buy award (for the fifth year in a row) 
2021 Pacifica won the 2020 CarBuzz Family Fun award 
2021 shortlisted for the 2021 Car of the Year by Motor Trend

Marketing 
In April 2016, Chrysler launched a television advertising campaign for the Pacifica entitled "Dad Brand", featuring comedian Jim Gaffigan and his children. In October 2016, Chrysler launched a social media-oriented campaign known as "PacifiKids", featuring videos in which unsuspecting families shopped for the vehicle at a dealership staffed entirely by children. The Pacifica has also been used in cross-promotional campaigns for the films The Secret Life of Pets and Incredibles 2.

Total sales 
US sales include both the Pacifica and Voyager.  Canada sales include both the Pacifica and Chrysler Grand Caravan.

Notes

References

External links

 

All-wheel-drive vehicles
Pacifica 2017
Front-wheel-drive vehicles
Minivans
2010s cars
Cars introduced in 2016
Plug-in hybrid vehicles
Cars of Canada